Ashtown Castle (Irish: Caisleán Bhaile an Ásaigh) is a tower house in the Phoenix Park in Dublin, Ireland. 

It was found hidden within the walls of a much larger and more recent Georgian building, the Under Secretary's Lodge also known as Ashtown Lodge, that was being used by the Papal Nuncio until 1978. At that time, the Lodge was deemed structurally irreparable due to dry rot. However, as the building was being demolished, Ashtown Castle was discovered. It has now been restored and forms part of the Phoenix Park Visitor Centre.

It is thought to originally date from the 1430s, as it is built to dimensions that conform with a government policy of the time that offered £10 to those who built a castle for their own safety. The castle was later incorporated into the construction of Ashtown Lodge which was to serve as the official residence of the Under Secretary from 1782.

The Phoenix Park Visitor Centre 
The Phoenix Park Visitor Centre is beside the Castle.  It has visitor information, an exhibition of the Phoenix Park History dating back from 3500BC to the present.  There is a restaurant in the visitors centre grounds.

References

External links

 Heritage Ireland

Castles in Dublin (city)
Historic house museums in the Republic of Ireland
Museums in Dublin (city)
Phoenix Park
Tower houses in the Republic of Ireland